Stelligera is a genus of plant in the family Amaranthaceae. It is a monotypic genus containing the single species Stelligera endecaspinis.

References 

Amaranthaceae